Formed in 1967 JAD Records was a record label that was co-owned by Johnny Nash, producer Arthur Jenkins, and businessman Danny Sims, whose initials formed its logo.  JAD Records was the label which signed Bob Marley, Peter Tosh, Bunny Wailer and Rita Marley to an exclusive long-term contract as recording artists from 1968 to 1972. Other notable artists to sign with the label included Johnny Nash himself, Byron Lee , Neville Willoughby  and later Jimmy Cliff.

In 1996 JAD released a set of reworked songs from the early years of Bob Marley's career on an album called Soul Almighty - The Formative Years Vol 1. This was followed by Black Progress - The Formative Years Vol 2. Both albums used the vocal tracks from Bob's early material from the 1960s and added modern backing tracks including vocals from Rita Marley, Bob's son Ziggy and members of the Melody Makers. The response to these modern day remixes was so hostile that the label released the groundbreaking Complete Wailers series with the original tracks over the next two years. Despite their best efforts they could not license the tracks that were already under contract to Island (as part of the Songs Of Freedom box set). However, several years later they managed to license all the tracks and various sets containing them were reissued on the now JAD/Universal records in 2004.

References

External links
 Soul Rebels  Bob Marley, Jad-Patrick Yafaoui & The Wailers 1962-1972

American record labels
Reggae record labels